The Quds Force is one of five branches of Iran's Islamic Revolutionary Guard Corps (IRGC) specializing in  unconventional warfare and military intelligence operations. U.S. Army's Iraq War General Stanley McChrystal describes the Quds Force as an organization analogous to a combination of the CIA and the Joint Special Operations Command (JSOC) in the United States. Responsible for extraterritorial operations, the Quds Force supports non-state actors in many countries, including Hezbollah, Hamas, Palestinian Islamic Jihad, Yemeni Houthis, and Shia militias in Iraq, Syria, and Afghanistan.

The Quds Force reports directly to the Supreme Leader of Iran, Ayatollah Khamenei. After Qassem Soleimani was killed, his deputy, Esmail Ghaani, replaced him. The U.S. Secretary of State designated the Islamic Revolutionary Guard Corps and Quds Force as a Foreign Terrorist Organization (FTO) in 2019 based on the IRGC's "continued support to and engagement in terrorist activity around the world." This was the first time that the U.S. ever designated another government's department as a FTO.

Name

While the formation's official name is Quds Force, it has also been referred to as the 'Quds Corps' in Persian media. In Arabic, Jerusalem is most commonly known as القُدس, transliterated as al-Quds and meaning "The Holy" or "The Holy Sanctuary", cognate with Hebrew: הקדש, romanized: Ha-Qodesh, lit. 'The Holy'.

History and mission
The predecessor of the Quds Force, known as 'Department 900', was created during the Iran–Iraq War as a special intelligence unit, while the IRGC was allegedly active abroad in Afghanistan before the war. The department was later merged into 'Special External Operations Department'. After the war in 1988, the IRGC was reorganized and the Quds Force was established as an independent service branch. It has the mission of liberating "Muslim land", especially al-Quds, from which it takes its name—"Jerusalem Force" in English.

Both during and after the war, it provided support to the Kurds fighting Saddam Hussein. In 1982, a Quds unit was deployed to Lebanon, where it assisted in the genesis of Hezbollah. The Force also expanded its operations into neighboring Afghanistan, including assistance for Abdul Ali Mazari's Shi'a Hezbe Wahdat in the 1980s against the government of Mohammad Najibullah. It then began funding and supporting Ahmad Shah Massoud's Northern Alliance against the Taliban. However, in recent years, the Quds Force is alleged to have been helping and guiding the Taliban insurgents against the NATO-backed Karzai administration. There were also reports of the unit lending support to Bosnian Muslims fighting the Bosnian Serbs during the Bosnian War.

According to the Egyptian newspaper Al-Ahram, former Iranian President Mahmoud Ahmadinejad helped fund the Quds Force while he was stationed at the Ramazan garrison near Iraq, during the late 1980s.

In January 2010, according to the Washington Institute for Near East Policy, the mission of the Quds Force was expanded and the Force along with Hezbollah started a new campaign of attacks targeting not only the US and Israel but also other Western bodies.

In January 2020, Quds Force commander Major General Qasem Soleimani was killed by a US airstrike on his convoy outside Baghdad International Airport.

The Quds force is ran from Tehran, and has ties with armed groups in Afghanistan, Iraq, Lebanon, Syria and the Palestinian territories.

Organization

The force is described as "active in dozens of countries." According to former U.S. Army intelligence officer David Dionisi, the Quds Force is organized into eight different directorates based on geographic location:
 Western countries (excluding Turkey, including the former Eastern Bloc)
 Former Soviet Union
 Iraq
 Afghanistan, Pakistan, and India
 Israel, Lebanon, and Jordan
 Turkey
 North Africa
 Arabian Peninsula

According to journalist Dexter Filkins, the force's members are "divided between combatants and those who train and oversee foreign assets," and the force is divided into branches focusing on "intelligence, finance, foreign languages, politics, sabotage, and special operations."  Members are chosen both for their skill and "allegiance to the doctrine of the Islamic Revolution."

In addition, Dionisi asserts in his book American Hiroshima that the Iranian Quds Force headquarters for operations in Iraq was moved in 2004 to the Iran-Iraq border in order to better supervise activities in Iraq. The Quds Force also operates a base in the former compound of the U.S. Embassy, which was overrun in 1979.

According to Filkins and American General Stanley A. McChrystal, it was the Quds Force that "flooded" Iraq with "explosively formed projectiles" which fire a molten copper slug able to penetrate armor, and which accounted for "nearly 20%" of American combat deaths in Iraq (i.e. hundreds of soldiers).  In September 2007, a few years after the publication of American Hiroshima: The Reasons Why and a Call to Strengthen America's Democracy in July 2006, General David Petraeus reported to Congress that the Quds Force had left Iraq. Petraeus said, "The Quds Force itself, we believe, by and large, those individuals have been pulled out of the country, as have the Lebanese Hezbollah trainers that were being used to augment that activity."

On 7 July 2008, journalist Seymour Hersh wrote an article in The New Yorker revealing that President Bush had signed a Presidential Finding authorizing the CIA and Joint Special Operations Command to conduct cross-border paramilitary operations from Iraq and Afghanistan into Iran. These operations would be against the Quds Force and "high-value targets." "The Finding was focused on undermining Iran's nuclear ambitions and trying to undermine the government through regime change," a person familiar with its contents said, and involved "working with opposition groups."

Size
The size of the Quds Force is classified and unknown. In 2007, Mahan Abedin of Center for the Study of Terrorism said that Quds Force numbers no more than 2,000 people, with 800 core operatives. Scott Shane, who interviewed several American scholars later that year, wrote that estimates range from 3,000 to 50,000. In 2013, Dexter Filkins wrote that the Quds Force has 10,000–20,000 members, "divided between combatants and those who train and oversee foreign assets". The 2020 edition of The Military Balance, published by the International Institute of Strategic Studies (IISS), estimated that the force has about 5,000 personnel.

In 2020, Jack Watling of the Royal United Services Institute estimated the Quds Force had the "divisional strength military formation" of approximately 17,000 to 21,000 members, split regionally.

Financing 
Companies controlled by the Quds Force maintain banking relationships with the Bank of Kunlun, a subsidiary of the China National Petroleum Corporation.

Outside analysis
While it reports directly to the Supreme Leader of Iran, there are debates over how independently Quds Force operates.

Mahan Abedin, director of research at the London-based Center for the Study of Terrorism (and editor of Islamism Digest), believes the unit is not independent: "Quds Force, although it's a highly specialized department, it is subject to strict, iron-clad military discipline. It's completely controlled by the military hierarchy of the IRGC, and the IRGC is very tightly controlled by the highest levels of the administration in Iran."

According to a Los Angeles Times report, in Abedin's view, "[I]t's a very capable force—their people are extremely talented, [and] they tend to be the best people in the IRGC".

Activities

The Quds Force trains and equips foreign Islamic revolutionary groups around the Middle East. The paramilitary instruction provided by the Quds Force typically occurs in Iran or Sudan. Foreign recruits are transported from their home countries to Iran to receive training. The Quds Force sometimes plays a more direct role in the military operations of the forces it trains, including pre-attack planning and other operation-specific military advice.

Afghanistan
Since 1979, Iran had supported the Shi'a Hezbe Wahdat forces against the Afghan government of Mohammad Najibullah. When Najibullah stepped down as President in 1992, Iran continued supporting Hezbe Wahdat against other Afghan militia groups. When the Taliban took over Afghanistan in 1996, Hezbe Wahdat had lost its founder and main leader, Abdul Ali Mazari, so the group joined Ahmad Shah Massoud's Northern Alliance. Iran began supporting the Northern Alliance against the Taliban, who were backed by Pakistan and the Arab world. In 1999, after several Iranian diplomats were killed by the Taliban in Mazar-e Sharif, Iran nearly got into a war with the Taliban. The Quds Force reportedly fought alongside the United States and the Northern Alliance in the Battle for Herat. However, in recent years Iran is accused of helping and training the Taliban insurgents against the NATO-backed Karzai administration. Iranian-made weapons, including powerful explosive devices are often found inside Afghanistan.

In March 2012, Najibullah Kabuli, leader of the National Participation Front (NPF) of Afghanistan, accused three senior leaders of Iran's Revolutionary Guards of plotting to assassinate him. Some members of the Afghan Parliament accuses Iran of setting up Taliban bases in several Iranian cities, and that "Iran is directly involved in fanning ethnic, linguistic and sectarian tensions in Afghanistan." There are reports about Iran's Revolutionary Guards training Afghans inside Iran to carry out terrorist attacks in Afghanistan.

India
Following an attack on an Israeli diplomat in India in February 2012, Delhi Police at the time contended that the Iranian Revolutionary Guard Corps had some involvement. This was subsequently confirmed in July 2012, after a report by the Delhi Police found evidence that members of Iranian Revolutionary Guard Corps had been involved in the 13 February bomb attack in the capital.

United States
On 11 October 2011, the Obama Administration revealed the United States Government's allegations that the Quds Force was involved with the plot to assassinate Saudi Arabia's Ambassador to the United States Adel al-Jubeir, which also entailed plans to bomb the Israeli and Saudi embassies located in Washington, D.C. In November, plans to assassinate former advisor of President of the United States John Bolton were discovered.

South America
It's been reported that Iran has been increasing its presence in Latin America through Venezuela. Little is known publicly what their objectives are in the region, but in 2009, Defense Secretary Robert Gates denounced Iran for meddling in "subversive activities" using Quds Forces. However, Iran claims it is merely "ensuring the survival of the regime" by propagating regional influence.

Juan Guaidó, President of the National Assembly of Venezuela, accused Nicolás Maduro in January 2020 of allowing Qasem Soleimani and his Quds Forces to incorporate their sanctioned banks and their companies in Venezuela. Guaidó also said that Soleimani "led a criminal and terrorist structure in Iran that for years caused pain to his people and destabilized the Middle East, just as Abu Mahdi al-Muhandis did with Hezbollah."

Iraq
The Quds Force has been described as the Iranian "unit deployed to challenge the United States presence" in Iraq following the U.S. invasion of that country, which put "165,000 American troops along Iran's western border," adding to the American troops already in Iran's eastern neighbor Afghanistan.

The force "operated throughout Iraq, arming, aiding, and abetting Shiite militias"—i.e., the Supreme Council for Islamic Revolution in Iraq, Dawa, and the Mahdi Army—"all" of which "had close ties to Iran, some dating back decades" as part of their struggle against Saddam Hussein's oppressive Arab nationalist regime.

In November 2006, with sectarian violence in Iraq increasing, U.S. General John Abizaid accused the Quds Force of supporting "Shi'a death squads", while the government of Iran was pledging support in stabilization. Similarly, in July 2007, Major General Kevin Bergner of the U.S. Army alleged that members of the Quds Force aided in the planning of a raid on U.S. forces in the Iraqi city of Karbala in January 2007.

Former CIA officer Robert Baer asserts the Quds Force uses couriers for all sensitive communications.

2006 detainment in Iraq
On 24 December 2006, The New York Times reported that at least four Iranians had been captured by American troops in Iraq in the previous few days. According to the article, the U.S. government suspected that two of them were members of Quds Force, which would be some of the first physical proof of Quds Force activity in Iraq. According to The Pentagon, the alleged Quds Force members were "involved in the transfer of IED technologies from Iran to Iraq." The two men had entered Iraq legally, although they were not accredited diplomats. Iraqi officials believed that the evidence against the men was only circumstantial, but on 29 December, and under U.S. pressure, the Iraqi government ordered the men to leave Iraq. They were driven back to Iran that day. In mid-January 2007 it was reported that the two alleged Quds force officers seized by American forces were Brig. Gen. Mohsen Chizari and Col. Abu Amad Davari. According to The Washington Post. Chizari is the third highest officer of Quds Force, making him the allegedly highest-ranked Iranian to ever be held by the United States.

New York Sun report
The New York Sun reported that the documents described the Quds Force as not only cooperating with Shi'a death squads, but also with fighters related to al-Qaeda and Ansar al-Sunna. It said that the Quds Force had studied the Iraq situation in a similar manner to the U.S. Iraq Study Group, and had concluded that they must increase efforts with Sunni and Shiite groups in order to counter the influence of Sunni states.

U.S. raid on Iranian liaison office

On 11 January 2007, U.S. forces raided and detained five employees of the Iranian liaison office in Erbil, Iraq. The U.S. military said the five detainees were connected to the Quds Force. The operation drew protests from the regional Kurdish government while the Russian government called the detainments unacceptable.

Alireza Nourizadeh, a political analyst at Voice of America, stated that their arrests were causing concern in Iranian intelligence because the five alleged officials were knowledgeable of a wide range of Quds Force and Iranian activities in Iraq. According to American ambassador Zalmay Khalilzad, one of the men in custody was Quds Force's director of operations.

Iranian and Iraqi officials maintained that the detained men were part of a diplomatic mission in the city of Erbil, Iraq. The five Iranian detainees were still being held at a U.S. prison in Iraq as of 8 July 2007. The U.S. said they were "still being interrogated" and that it had "no plans to free them while they are seen as a security risk in Iraq." Iran said that the detainees were "kidnapped diplomats" and that they were "held as hostages."

On 9 July 2009, the five detainees were released from U.S. custody to Iraqi officials.

Allegations of involvement in Karbala attack

On 20 January 2007, a group of gunmen attacked the Karbala Provincial Joint Coordination Center in Karbala, captured four American soldiers, and subsequently killed them. The attackers passed through an Iraqi checkpoint at around 5 pm, a total of five black GMC Suburbans, similar to those driven by U.S. security and diplomatic officials. They were also wearing American military uniforms and spoke fluent English. Because of the sophistication of the attack, some analysts have suggested that only a group like the Quds Force would be able to plan and carry out such an action. Former CIA officer Robert Baer also suggested that the five Americans were killed by the Quds Force in revenge for the Americans holding five Iranians since the 11 January raid in Irbil. It was reported that the U.S. military is investigating whether or not the attackers were trained by Iranian officials; however, no evidence besides the sophistication of the attack has yet been presented.

On 2 July 2007, the U.S. military said that information from captured Hezbollah fighter Ali Musa Daqduq established a link between the Quds Force and the Karbala raid. The U.S. military claims Daqduq worked as a liaison between Quds force operatives and the Shia group that carried out the raid. According to the United States, Daqduq said that the Shia group "could not have conducted this complex operation without the support and direction of the Quds force".

Allegations of support for Iraqi militants
In June 2007, U.S. General Ray Odierno asserted that Iranian support for these Shia militia increased as the United States itself implemented the 2007 "troop surge". Two different studies have maintained that approximately half of all foreign insurgents entering Iraq come from Saudi Arabia.

In December 2009 evidence uncovered during an investigation by The Guardian newspaper and Guardian Films linked the Quds Force to the kidnappings of five Britons from a government ministry building in Baghdad in 2007. Four of the hostages, Jason Creswell, Jason Swindlehurst, Alec Maclachlan, and Alan McMenemy, were killed. Peter Moore was released on 30 December 2009. The investigation uncovered evidence that Moore, 37, a computer expert from Lincoln was targeted because he was installing a system for the Iraqi Government that would show how a vast amount of international aid was diverted to Iran's militia groups in Iraq. One of the alleged groups funded by the Quds force directly is the Righteous League, which emerged in 2006 and has stayed largely in the shadows as a proxy of the Quds Force. Shia cleric and leading figure of the Righteous League, Qais al-Khazali, was handed over by the U.S. military for release by the Iraqi government on 29 December 2009 as part of the deal that led to the release of Moore.

Allegations by U.S. President Bush
In a 14 February 2007 news conference U.S. President George W. Bush reiterated his claim that the Quds Force was causing unrest in Iraq, stating:

I can say with certainty that the Quds force, a part of the Iranian government, has provided these sophisticated IEDs that have harmed our troops. And I'd like to repeat, I do not know whether or not the Quds Force was ordered from the top echelons of government. But my point is what's worse – them ordering it and it happening, or them not ordering it and it happening? And so we will continue to protect our troops. ... to say it [this claim] is provoking Iran is just a wrong way to characterize the Commander-in-Chief's decision to do what is necessary to protect our soldiers in harm's way. And I will continue to do so. ... Whether Ahmadinejad ordered the Quds force to do this, I don't think we know. But we do know that they're there, and I intend to do something about it. And I've asked our commanders to do something about it. And we're going to protect our troops. ... I don't think we know who picked up the phone and said to the Quds Force, go do this, but we know it's a vital part of the Iranian government. ...What matters is, is that we're responding. The idea that somehow we're manufacturing the idea that the Iranians are providing IEDs is preposterous. ... My job is to protect our troops. And when we find devices that are in that country that are hurting our troops, we're going to do something about it, pure and simple. ... does this mean you're trying to have a pretext for war? No. It means I'm trying to protect our troops.

Mohsen Sazegara, who was a high-ranking Tehran official before turning against the government, has argued that Ahmadinejad does not control the Guards outside of Iran. "Not only the foreign ministry of Iran; even the president does not know what the Revolutionary Guards does outside of Iran. They directly report to the leader", he said, referring to Grand Ayatollah Ali Khamenei. Although Ali Khamenei is the ultimate person in charge of the Quds Force, George Bush did not mention him. According to Richard Clarke, "Quds force reports directly to the Supreme Ayatollah, through the commander-in-chief of the revolutionary guards."

Detainment of alleged bomb smuggler
On 20 September 2007, the U.S. military arrested an Iranian during a raid on a hotel in Sulaimaniyah, a city in the Kurdish-controlled north. The military accused the Iranian of being a member of the elite Quds Force and smuggling powerful roadside bombs, including armor-piercing explosively formed penetrators, into Iraq. The military said intelligence reports asserted the suspect was involved in the infiltration and training of foreign fighters into Iraq as well.

On 22 September 2007, Iraqi President Jalal Talabani criticized the United States for arresting the Iranian and called for his immediate release. Talabani argued he is a civil servant who was on an official trade mission in the Kurdish Region and stated Iraqi and Kurdish regional government representatives were aware of the man's presence in the country. "I express to you our outrage for these American forces arresting this Iranian civil official visitor without informing or cooperating with the government of the Kurdistan region, which means insult and disregard for its rights", Talabani wrote in a "letter of resentment" to Ryan Crocker, U.S. ambassador to Iraq, and Gen. David Petraeus.

Allegations of 2007 market attack
On 24 November 2007, US military officials accused an Iranian special group of placing a bomb in a bird box that blew up at a popular animal market in central Baghdad. "The group's purpose was to make it appear Al Qaeda in Iraq was responsible for the attack", Admiral Smith said. He further emphasized there was "no evidence Iran ordered the attack". In May 2008, Iraq said it had no evidence that Iran was supporting militants on Iraqi soil. Al-Sadr spokesman Al-Ubaydi said the presence of Iranian weapons in Iraq is "quite normal," since "they are bought and sold and any party can buy them."

Allegations of ties to Al-Qaeda
According to reports produced by Agence France-Presse (AFP), The Jerusalem Post, and Al Arabiya, at the request of a member of the United States' House Permanent Select Committee on Intelligence, in 2011 Congressional counter-terrorism advisor Michael S. Smith II of Kronos Advisory, LLC produced a report on Iran's alleged ties to Al-Qaeda that was distributed to members of the Congressional Anti-Terrorism Caucus. Titled "The al-Qa'ida-Qods Force Nexus: Scratching the Surface of a Known Unknown", a redacted version of Smith's report is available online via the blog site owned by American military geostrategist and The Pentagon's New Map author Thomas P.M. Barnett. The report's Issue Summary section explains: "This report focuses on the history of Iran's relationship with al-Qa'ida, and briefly addresses potential implications of these ties. Additionally, its author provides a list of recommended action items for Members of the United States Congress, as well as a list of questions that may help Members develop a better understanding of this issue through interactions with defense and intelligence officials".
A member of the Quds Force was alleged arrested with 21 other suspects in the attack on the Israeli and United States embassies on 14 March 2012 in Azerbaijan.

Combat against Islamic State

In 2014, Quds Force was deployed into Iraq to lead Iranian action against ISIL. Iran sent three Quds Force battalions to help the Iraqi government repel ISIL's 2014 Northern Iraq offensive. Over 40 officers participated in the Second Battle of Tikrit, including the commander of the force, Gen. Qasem Soleimani who took a leading role in the operation.

2020 drone strike on Qasem Soleimani in Iraq

On 3 January 2020, a drone strike approved by United States President Donald Trump at Baghdad International Airport killed General Qasem Soleimani, the head of the Quds Force. He was replaced by General Esmail Ghaani 

In November 2021 the Commander of the corps went to Iraq for a visit.

Lebanon
In 1982, deployed to Lebanon for resupplying materiel for Hezbullah

Syria

In 2011, the Quds Force deployed to Syria. IRGC Commander Jafari announced on 16 September 2012 that Quds Force "were present" in Syria.

Coinciding with the Geneva II Conference on Syria in 2014, Iran boosted its presence in Syria with several "hundred" military specialists, including senior commanders from the Quds Force, according to Iranian sources and security experts. While recently retired senior IRGC commander told that there were at least 60 to 70 Quds force commanders on the ground in Syria at any given time. The primary role of these forces is to gather intelligence and manage the logistics of the battle for the Syrian Government.

In November 2015, the Quds Force conducted a successful rescue mission of a Russian bomber pilot who was shot down by a Turkish fighter jet.

In May 2018, Quds forces on the Syrian-held side of the Golan Heights allegedly fired around 20 projectiles towards Israeli army positions without causing damage or casualties. Israel responded with airstrikes against Iranian bases in Syria. At least twenty-three fighters, among them 18 foreigners, were reportedly killed in the strikes.

In January 2019, the Israel Defense Forces confirmed that it had carried out strikes against Iranian military targets in Syria several hours after a rocket was intercepted over the Golan Heights. The Israeli military claimed in a statement that Quds Force positions were targeted and included a warning to the Syrian military against "attempting to harm Israeli forces or territory."

In April 2021, prominent Syria-based Quds operative Brigadier General Mohammad Reza Fallahzadeh became Quds Deputy Commander.

Africa
IN 2021, the African network was dismantled by the Israeli intelligence agency Mossad.

Germany
In January 2018, German authorities conducted raids in Baden-Württemberg, North Rhine-Westphalia, Bavaria and Berlin, searching homes and businesses belonging to ten alleged Iranian Quds Force members, suspected of spying on Israeli and Jewish targets.

Yemen
In 2014, deployed for advisor role as Ansar Allah in Yemeni Civil War.

Commanders

Designation as a terrorist organization
The United States Department of the Treasury designated the Quds Force under Executive Order 13224 for providing material support to US-designated terrorist organizations on 25 October 2007, prohibiting transactions between the group and U.S. citizens, and freezing any assets under U.S. jurisdiction. The Government of Canada designated the Quds Force as a terrorist organization on 17 December 2012. Israel designated the Quds Force as a terrorist organization in March 2015.

On 23 October 2018, the kingdoms of Saudi Arabia and Bahrain, both involved in Saudi Arabian-led intervention in Yemen against Quds Force-backed Houthis, designated the IRGC as a terrorist organization. The designation also included former commander Qasem Soleimani.

In April 2019, the U.S. made the decision to designate the Islamic Revolutionary Guard Corps (IRGC), a foreign military, as a foreign terrorist organization by the State Department under an immigration statute and their maximum pressure campaign. This designation was done over the opposition of the Central Intelligence Agency (CIA) and the Department of Defense (DoD).

On 28 August 2019, when Israel's foreign minister Katz made a visit to the United Kingdom, he asked the UK's foreign minister Dominic Raab to designate the Quds Force as a terrorist organization.
Rewards for justice offers $15 million for information on QF financing.

Sanctions

Designates IRGC-Qods Force Front Company 
On 1 May 2020, The U.S. Department of the Treasury's Office of Foreign Assets Control (OFAC) designated dual Iranian and Iraqi national Amir Dianat, associate of Revolutionary Guards Quds Force officials. The religion, Dianat, who also known as Amir Abdulazeez Jaafar, has been involved in the Quds Force's efforts to generate revenue and smuggle weapons abroad. The U.S. Department of the Treasury's Office of Foreign Assets Control (OFAC) also designating "Taif" Mineral Mining Services Company, a company owned, controlled, or directed by Dianat.

See also

 Intelligence Organization of the Islamic Revolutionary Guard Corps

References

Sources
 Dionisi, David J. American Hiroshima: The Reasons Why and a Call to Strengthen America's Democracy. Trafford Publishing, 2005.  Sanzini Publishing for the 2006/2007 Korean version. 

 
1988 establishments in Iran
Military units and formations established in 1988
Islamic Revolutionary Guard Corps military branches
Special forces of Iran
Iranian security organisations
Foreign relations of Iran
Military intelligence agencies
Anti-Soviet factions in the Soviet–Afghan War
Anti-ISIL factions in Iraq
Anti-ISIL factions in Syria
Pro-government factions of the Syrian civil war
Military units and formations of the War in Afghanistan (2001–2021)
Military units and formations of the Bosnian War
Organizations based in Asia designated as terrorist
Organizations designated as terrorist by the United States
Organizations designated as terrorist by Canada
Entities added to the Consolidated List by Australia
Iranian intelligence agencies